The 43rd New Zealand Parliament was a term of the Parliament of New Zealand. Its composition was determined by the 1990 elections, and it sat until the 1993 elections.

The 43rd Parliament saw the beginning of the fourth National Party government, with the Labour Party failing to win a third term in office.  The 43rd Parliament was heavily dominated by National, which controlled nearly seventy percent of the seats. Only one minor party, Jim Anderton's NewLabour, was present at the beginning of the 43rd Parliament. Later, NewLabour would join with several unrepresented parties to form the Alliance, which would gain two additional seats when two National MPs defected. Another National MP, Winston Peters, would also break away from his party, becoming an independent.

The 43rd Parliament consisted of ninety-seven representatives, the same as the previous Parliament. All of these representatives were chosen by single-member geographical electorates, including four Māori electorates.

Electoral boundaries for the 43rd Parliament

Overview of seats
The table below shows the number of MPs in each party following the 1990 election and at dissolution:

Notes
 Jim Anderton, Leader of the NewLabour Party merged the party into the newly founded Alliance party.
The Working Government majority is calculated as all Government MPs less all other parties.

Initial composition of the 43rd Parliament

By-elections during 43rd Parliament
There were a number of changes during the term of the 43rd Parliament.

Summary of changes during term
Jim Anderton, the sole MP for the NewLabour Party, merged his party with several others to form the Alliance in 1991. Anderton was thereafter recorded as an Alliance MP rather than a NewLabour MP.
Robert Muldoon, the National Party MP for Tamaki and a former Prime Minister of New Zealand, quit Parliament on 17 December 1991. His departure prompted a by-election in Tamaki early the following year — it was won by Clem Simich, also of the National Party.
Gilbert Myles and Hamish MacIntyre, the National Party MPs for Roskill and Manawatu, respectively, quit their party in 1992. They established a small group Liberal Party, which they eventually merged into the Alliance.
Fran Wilde, the Labour Party MP for Wellington Central, quit Parliament in 1992 to become Mayor of Wellington. Her departure prompted a by-election in Wellington Central in December — it was won by Chris Laidlaw, also of the Labour Party.
Cam Campion, the National Party MP for Wanganui, announced his resignation from the party on 3 March 1993. He accused the party of attempting to rig the reselection process against him. Campion remained an independent for the remainder of the term.
Winston Peters, the National Party MP for Tauranga, resigned from both his party and his seat on 18 March 1993. His departure prompted a by-election in Tauranga in April — Peters contested and won it as an independent candidate. Later, he would found the New Zealand First party.
Myles left the Alliance to join Peters in New Zealand First.

Notes

References

New Zealand parliaments